Love Changes Everything may refer to:
"Love Changes Everything" (song), a song from the musical Aspects of Love, originally sung by Michael Ball
Love Changes Everything (Sarah Brightman album), 2005
"Love Changes (Everything)", a 1987 single from Climie Fisher, later covered by Musikk
Love Changes Everything (Aaron Lines album), 2001, and its title song
"Love Changes Everything", a single by Honeymoon Suite from their 1988 album Racing After Midnight